Mauricio Hernández may refer to:

 Mauricio Hernández Norambuena (born 1958), Chilean guerrilla fighter
 Mauricio Hernández (athlete) (born 1961), Mexican athlete
 Mauricio Hernández (footballer) (born 1993), Mexican football player